The Powering Past Coal Alliance (PPCA) is a group of 166 countries, cities, regions and organisations aiming to accelerate the fossil-fuel phase out of coal-fired power stations, except the very few which have carbon capture and storage. It has been described as a "non-proliferation treaty" for fossil fuels. The project was undertaken with financial support from the Government of Canada, through their environmental department known as Environment and Climate Change Canada.

History

The Alliance was launched by Canada and the UK at the COP23 climate summit in November 2017. Announcing the launch, Climate Action Network-Canada Executive Director Catherine Abreu said:

By the end of the summit, membership had grown to include over 20 countries, regions and organizations. Within a month membership had grown to over 50 .  Its purpose is to establish a new international norm, or “standard of appropriate behaviour”, that coal should not be burned for power.

In April 2018 a research partnership was announced with Bloomberg Philanthropies.

In October 2018 the South Korean province of South Chungcheong became the first jurisdiction in Asia and the largest user of coal power to join the Alliance. In December 2018 Sydney, Melbourne, Scotland, Scottish Power, Senegal and Israel also joined and in September 2019 seven new members joined including Germany and Slovakia.

In June 2020 6 global finance organisations joined including Desjardins Group, the first major North American financial institution to join.

During 2021 at least 38 new members joined including Hungary, Uruguay, Chile, Estonia, Singapore, Slovenia and Ukraine.

Aims
Alliance members agree that:

 Governments/states will phase out existing traditional coal power.
 Governments/states will create a moratorium on any new traditional coal power stations without operational carbon capture and storage.
 Businesses/organisations will power operations without coal.
 Members will ensure policies and investments support clean power.
 Members will restrict financing for traditional coal power without carbon capture and storage.

Reaction
Reacting to the launch, Tracy Carty of Oxfam said the Alliance:

Business change organisation The B Team welcomed the Alliance, and argued that exiting coal must happen as a just transition that protects vulnerable workers and communities such as coal mining communities.

Members
Members of the Powering Past Coal Alliance as of April 2022 were:

Nations

Albania
Angola
Austria
Azerbaijan
Belgium
Canada
Chile
Costa Rica
Croatia
Denmark
El Salvador
Estonia
Ethiopia
Fiji
Finland
France
Germany
Greece
Hungary
Ireland
Israel
Italy
Latvia
Liechtenstein
Lithuania
Luxembourg
Marshall Islands
Mauritius
Mexico
Montenegro
Netherlands
New Zealand
Niue
North Macedonia
Peru
Portugal
Senegal
Singapore
Slovakia
Slovenia
Spain
Sweden
Switzerland
Tuvalu
Ukraine
United Kingdom
Uruguay
Vanuatu

Sub-national entities

Alberta, Canada
Australian Capital Territory, Australia
Baden-Württemberg, Germany
Balearic Islands, Spain
British Columbia, Canada
California, USA
Connecticut, USA
Daegu, South Korea
Durban, South Africa
Eastern Wielkopolska, Poland
Gangwon, South Korea
Guimaras, Philippines
Gyeonggi, South Korea
Hawaii, USA
Honolulu, USA
Ilocos Norte, Philippines
Incheon, South Korea
Jeju, South Korea
Jeollanam, South Korea
Kaohsiung City
Koszalin, Poland
Kyoto City
Los Angeles, USA
Masbate, Philippines
Melbourne, Australia
Minnesota, USA
Negros Occidental, Philippines
Negros Oriental, Philippines
New Jersey, USA
New Mexico, USA
New Taipei City
New York, USA
Ontario, Canada
Oregon, USA
Ormoc, Philippines
Philadelphia, USA
Puerto Rico
Quebec, Canada
Rotterdam, Netherlands
Scotland, UK
Seoul, South Korea
South Chungcheong, South Korea
Sydney, Australia
Taichung City, Taiwan
Vancouver, Canada
Wales, UK
Wałbrzych, Poland
Washington, USA

Businesses and other organisations

Aberdeen Standard Investments
Alterra Power
Amundi
ArcTern Ventures
Autodesk
Avant Garde Innovations
Aviva
Axa Investment Managers
BT
Caisse de dépôt et placement du Québec
Caisse des dépôts et consignations
CalPERS
Capital Power
CCLA Investment Management Limited
Central Finance Board of the Methodist Church and Epworth IM
Church Commissioners for England
Church of England Pensions Board
Desjardins Group
Diageo
Drax
DSM
DTEK
Econet Group
EcoSmart
EDP
Electricité de France (EDF)
Eneva
Engie
Ethos Foundation
Export Development Canada
Fidelity International
Generation Investment Management
GeoExchange Coalition
GreenScience
Hermes Investment Management
HSBC
Iberdrola
Impax Asset Management
Indika Energy
Kering
Legal & General
Lloyds Bank
M&G Plc
Marks and Spencer
Mott MacDonald
National Grid
National Grid (ESO)
Natura Cosmetics
NatWest
Ontario Power Generation
Ørsted
Pacific Islands Development Forum
PensionDanmark
Robeco
Salesforce
Schroders
SCOR Global Investments
Scottish Power
SSE
Stichting Pensioenfonds ABP
Storebrand
Swiss Re
TransAlta
Unilever
United Church of Canada
Vancity
Varma Mutual Pension Insurance Company
Virgin Group
XPND Capital
ZE PAK

See also
Peak coal
Beyond Coal
Under2 Coalition
C40 Cities Climate Leadership Group
Fossil Fuel Non-Proliferation Treaty Initiative

References

External links

Coal phase-out
Emissions reduction
Energy policy
Technological phase-outs